John Arundel (or Arundell; died 1477) was a medieval Bishop of Chichester.

Biography
A native of Cornwall, Arundel was a fellow of Exeter College, Oxford, from 1421 to 1430, and served as university proctor in 1426. He was domestic chaplain and confessor to King Henry VI, who exerted influence on his behalf to gain him preferment in the Church, though without conspicuous success. He became precentor of Hereford in 1432, and archdeacon of Richmond in 1457, and also held prebends from Wells, Lincoln, Lichfield, Hereford, York and St Paul's; but the king failed in his attempts to have Arundel named Bishop of Durham.

He was a Canon of Windsor from 1449 - 1459.

Arundel was nominated to the see of Chichester on 8 January 1459, and consecrated on 3 June 1459. He died on 18 October 1477, and was buried in Chichester Cathedral.

Citations

References
 
 

1477 deaths
Bishops of Chichester
15th-century English Roman Catholic bishops
Archdeacons of Richmond
Medieval Cornish people
Fellows of Exeter College, Oxford
Canons of Windsor
Year of birth unknown